Dead and Alive is the first post-war novel of Hammond Innes. It is based on his own experience as an army major in Italy. Jack Adrian relates that "the manuscript...emerged with him when he was demobbed, just after completing an arduous skiing course in the Italian Dolomites.''

References

1946 British novels
Novels by Hammond Innes
William Collins, Sons books
Novels set in Italy